Metodi Deyanov (born 3 April 1975 in Sofia), is a former Bulgarian football attacking midfielder. He ended his career at the end of 2007–08 season.

He made his debut for CSKA Sofia on 7 May 1994, in a home match against Shumen. The fans soon drew comparisons between Deyanov and club legend Dimitar Yakimov. Deyanov played several seasons in the Greek Super League for OFI Crete. A highly talented player, his career was plagued by numerous injuries, the most serious of which he suffered in April 1998, keeping him out of action for close to a year.

References

1975 births
Living people
Bulgarian footballers
Bulgarian expatriate footballers
PFC CSKA Sofia players
OFI Crete F.C. players
Anorthosis Famagusta F.C. players
First Professional Football League (Bulgaria) players
Super League Greece players
Cypriot First Division players
Expatriate footballers in Greece
Bulgarian expatriate sportspeople in Greece
Expatriate footballers in Cyprus
Association football midfielders